Calvin Dorsey Harris Jr. (born February 19, 1991) is an American professional basketball player for Hapoel Holon of the Israeli Basketball Premier League. Standing at 1.91 m (6' 3"), he plays the point guard and shooting guard position.

Playing career
C.J. Harris played four seasons of college basketball at the Wake Forest University. He went undrafted in 2013 NBA draft, but later played for Denver Nuggets in the 2013 NBA Summer League.

In July 2013, Harris signed his first professional contract with the German team MHP Riesen Ludwigsburg for the 2013–14 season.

On July 10, 2014, he moved to another German Bundesliga club ratiopharm Ulm.
On March 3, 2015, he signed with Latvian powerhouse VEF Rīga.

For the 2015–16 season, Harris signed with Rosa Radom in Poland. With Rosa, he won the Polish Basketball Cup, and Harris was named the Cup MVP.

On January 21, 2020, he has signed with Türk Telekom of the Turkish Super League.  He  averaged 5.3 points and 2.5 assists per game. On August 6, he signed with Hapoel Holon of the Israeli Basketball Premier League.

On July 19, 2021, he signed with JL Bourg of the French LNB Pro A. JL Bourg also plays in the EuroCup. 

On June 19, 2022, he has signed Hapoel Holon of the Israeli Basketball Premier League and returned for a second stint.

The Basketball Tournament
C.J. Harris played for Team Wake The Nation in the 2018 edition of The Basketball Tournament. He had nine points, two rebounds and a steal in the team's first-round loss to Team Showtime.

References

1991 births
Living people
American men's basketball players
American expatriate basketball people in France
American expatriate basketball people in Germany
American expatriate basketball people in Latvia
American expatriate basketball people in Poland
American expatriate basketball people in Turkey
Basketball players from Winston-Salem, North Carolina
BK VEF Rīga players
Élan Béarnais players
Hapoel Holon players
JL Bourg-en-Bresse players
Riesen Ludwigsburg players
Point guards
Ratiopharm Ulm players
Rosa Radom players
Sakarya BB players
Shooting guards
Wake Forest Demon Deacons men's basketball players